The Clarenville Dragway was a drag racing strip located just outside Clarenville, Newfoundland & Labrador. It was the only dragstrip in the province at the time, and the site doubled as Clarenville Airport. The Clarenville Dragway closed in 2014 being replaced by Eastbound Park in Avondale Newfoundland.

External links
 Clarenville Dragway

Drag racing venues in Canada
2014 disestablishments in Newfoundland and Labrador